Bring Me Morecambe & Wise is a five-part television documentary series that goes behind the scenes of one of Morecambe and Wise acts. The series was first shown on UK television station Gold in November 2012. The first of five sixty minute shows aired on 21 November 2012.

In the series, people close to the duo are interviewed about their shared experiences during the 1970s and 1980s.
The series also showcases never-before-seen sketches and routines from the double act and clips from some of their earliest TV performances, as well as an interview with Eric Morecambe's wife Joan.

Episode list

References

External links

Bring Me Morecambe & Wise at UKTV

2012 British television series debuts
2012 British television series endings
2010s British documentary television series
Morecambe and Wise
Gold (British TV channel) original programming
English-language television shows